Tim Kelly (born April 3, 1967) is an American politician and businessman who serves as the
74th mayor of Chattanooga, Tennessee. He defeated Kim White in the runoff election held on April 13, 2021, by a margin of 15,966 to 10,661.

Early life and education
Tim Kelly was born on April 3, 1967, in Chattanooga, Tennessee, to Betty Sue and Patrick Kelly. Kelly is a 1985 graduate of Baylor School in Chattanooga. He was a John Jay Scholar, and majored in German Comparative Literature at Columbia University, graduating in 1989. At Columbia, he was a roommate of Brent Forrester, who went on to become a writer of The Simpsons and showrunner of popular shows such as The Office. After graduating, he returned to Chattanooga, where he began working and eventually took over the family's auto dealerships. Kelly returned to school in 2012, earning his M.B.A at Emory University in Atlanta.

Business career
After graduating from college, Tim Kelly took over his family's car business in Chattanooga, which consisted of a Cadillac and SAAB dealership. He added a Subaru dealership during his first year in business, and later began selling GMC Trucks, Hummers, Mitsubishis, and Infinitis. In 2001 he founded Polaris of Chattanooga, and in 2003 he started Southern Honda Powersports. He later created the Zipflip and SocialBot apps. Kelly had taken on several roles in Chattanooga community organizations including sitting on the boards of the Chattanooga Chamber of Commerce, the Community Foundation, Benwood, and the River City Company. Kelly is also a trustee of the Baylor School.

Chattanooga FC
In 2009 Kelly co-founded the Chattanooga FC along with Krue Brock, Marshall Brock, Paul Rustand, Sean McDaniel, Daryl Heald, Hamilton Brock, Thomas Clark, and Sheldon Grizzle. The team was founded to play in the National Premier Soccer League (NPSL), the fourth tier of the American soccer pyramid and considered roughly equal to the USL Premier Development League.

Kelly was integral in organizing the first public stock offering of any American soccer team using the securities reform laws passed in late 2016 that allowed such investments. Under Kelly's direction, Chattanooga Football Club is the only major team other than the Green Bay Packers to offer common stock to the public. Chattanooga FC exceeded the $500,000 mark in public funding in February 2019. 44% of people with stock are from outside the Chattanooga metro area and come from 44 states and ten different countries.

Mayor of Chattanooga
Kelly announced his intention to run for mayor on May 21, 2020, to succeed then-incumbent Andy Berke, who was term-limited. On March 2, 2021, Kelly received 30% of the votes cast in the general election, the highest number of votes of the 15 candidates in the race. Kelly won the mayoral runoff election against Kim White on April 13, 2021, with 60% of the votes. He was inaugurated on April 19, 2021. Kelly has stated that he does not identify with any political party.

References

1967 births
Living people
21st-century American businesspeople
21st-century American politicians
Businesspeople from Tennessee
Columbia College (New York) alumni
Emory University alumni
Mayors of Chattanooga, Tennessee
Tennessee Independents